Sakini Ramachandraih (born 1 January 1963) is a vocal folk singer and Dhol player from the Bhadradri town in the Telangana State in India. He is known for his expertise in "Kanchumelam-Kanchuthalam" an art form particularly identified with the Koya tribal community in Telangana and Andhra Pradesh. This art form is almost on the verge of extinction and Ramachandraih is the only surviving practitioner of the art who can narrate the history of the sacred festival "Sammakka Sarakka Jathara" in both Telugu and Koya languages in its full totality.
In the year 2022, Govt of India honoured  	Ramachandraiah by conferring the Padma Shri award for his contributions to art.

Life and work
Sakini Ramachandraih was born in Bhadradri, Kottagudem District, Manuguru Zone, Koonavaram in Telangana to the Koya tribe couble Musalayya-Gangamma on 1 January 1963. He has had no formal education and he remains an illiterate even now. However, from the age twelve, he had shown a passion for the art of playing Dhol which, probably, he had inherited from his grandparents. The Koya tribal artistes have a great tradition of orally handing over their repertoire of songs to newer generations  and Ramachandraih has memorised a large collection of these songs. The themes of these songs include stories of tribal warriors such as Sammakka-Saralamma, Girikamaraju, Pagididda Raju, Ramaraju, Gadiraju, Bapanamma, Musalamma, Nagulamma, Sadalamma etc. They also include stories of the birth of tribes and family histories. The artistes play an important role in festivals and in important days like marriage day in Koya houses.

The art practiced by Ramachandraih is also known "Kanchumelam-Kanchuthalam" and is almost on the verge of extinction. Ramachandraih is the only surviving practitioner of the art who can narrate the history of  "Sammakka Sarakka Jathara" (also known as "Sammakka Saralamma Jatara" or "Medaram Jatara") festival in both Telugu and Koya languages in its full totality.

Ramachandraiah’s talent came into wider attention for the first time in 2014 when he narrated the history of Sammakka-Saralakka, two tribal women (mother and daughter) who fought against Kakatiya rulers in the 13th century. “It became an instant hit. He has also popularized other ballads such as Boponamma Katha, Godi Kama Roaju Katba, etc.” said Jayadheer Tirumala Rao, a retired professor of Telugu University, who has recorded and documented Ramachandraiah’s oral narratives.

Padma Shri award

In the year 2022, Govt of India conferred the Padma Shri award, the third highest award in the Padma series of awards, on  Ramachandraiah for his distinguished service in the field of art. The award is in recognition of his service as a "Koya tribal singer from Bhadradri - amongst the last preserving the ancient practice of reciting the oral histories of the Koya tribe".

See also
Padma Shri Award recipients in the year 2022

References

External links

, interview in Telugu (26 minutes 27 seconds)

Recipients of the Padma Shri in arts
Living people
1963 births